The 2016 Asian Junior Athletics Championships was the 17th edition of the international athletics competition for Asian under-20 athletes, organised by the Asian Athletics Association and the Vietnam Athletics Federation. Athletes born between 1997 and 2000 competed in 44 events, divided evenly between the sexes. The competition took place over four days from 3–6 June at Thống Nhất Stadium in Ho Chi Minh City, Vietnam. A total of 45 countries entered athletes into the tournament, eighteen of which reached the medal table.  The competition, including its opening and closing ceremonies, was broadcast live on Vietnamese carrier VTV6

Japan topped the medal table with thirteen gold medals among a total of 27, overturning a long period of Chinese dominance. China was a comfortable second, with 22 medals, half of which were gold. India was the next best performing nation and the only other to reach double digits in the medal count, taking seven golds. The hosts Vietnam took two golds and placed seventh in the medals overall.

Malaysia's Khairul Hafiz Jantan was the most successful athlete of the competition, winning three medals: the 100 metres gold, and silvers in the 200 metres and 4 × 100 metres relay. Yang Chun-han was the only man to take two golds, topping the podium in the latter two events. On the women's side, there were two double gold medallists: Jisna Mathew led India to a 400 m individual and relay double, while Lili Das scored a middle-distance double. Japan's Haruko Ishizuka took 400 m bronze after winning the hurdles gold and her compatriots Shinichi Yukinaga and Nanaka Kori also took minor medals in the discus after becoming shot put winners.

The event was held in the month before the global 2016 IAAF World U20 Championships. Several of Asia's medallists at that competition were not present at the regional meet, although Qatar's Mohamed Ibrahim Moaaz became a double discus throw champion and India's Neeraj Chopra improved from a silver in Ho Chi Minh to a world under-20 gold with a world junior record throw. The 2016 world under-20 high jump bronze medallist Mohamat Allamine Hamdi managed only sixth on the Asian stage that year.

Medal summary

Men

Women

2016 Medal table
Key

References

Results
Results (archived)
Daily reports
Ramsak, Bob (2016-06-05). Jantan and Liu take 100m titles as Asian Junior Championships reach midway point. IAAF. Retrieved on 2016-12-28.
Mulkeen, Jon (2016-06-06). Sado takes surprise javelin victory at Asian Junior Championships. IAAF. Retrieved on 2016-12-28.

Asian Junior Athletics Championships
Asian Junior Championships
Junior Athletics Championships
Asian Junior Athletics Championships
Sport in Ho Chi Minh City
International athletics competitions hosted by Vietnam